WIMI (99.7 FM, "The Storm") is a radio station broadcasting a Classic Rock format. Licensed to Ironwood, Michigan, it first began broadcasting in 1974, with its signal covering most of the western Upper Peninsula and the extreme northern portion of Wisconsin; because of the effects of tropospheric ducting, it is also easily heard across Lake Superior in Duluth, Minnesota to the point that in 2017, it asked the FCC to move a recently launched VCY America translator on 99.7 in Duluth to move dial positions due to crossover interference (it moved to 97.7).

History

After years as a construction permit (including briefly being WJMS-FM), WIMI went on the air Thursday, November 13, 1975. Initially, the station ran Drake-Chenault's "Hitparade" format (later Contempo 300); the station used Drake programming well into the 1980s and eventually morphed into an adult hits format. In 2017, the station switched from a variety of AC formats to all classic rock. Local personalities include Bill Swift and Sam Erspamer.

In 2017, the station was fined $4,000 by the FCC for originating programming directly from its Park Falls, Wisconsin translator. The translator had aired music while the parent station aired Green Bay Packers games that the Park Falls station could not air for territorial reasons to protect WCQM, that town's affiliate.

Sources 
Michiguide.com - WIMI History

Notes

External links

FCC History Cards for WIMI

IMI-FM
Hot adult contemporary radio stations in the United States
Radio stations established in 1975